Sihui,  formerly romanized as Szewui, is a county-level city in the west of the Pearl River Delta region in Guangdong province, China. It is administered as part of the prefecture-level city of Zhaoqing. Sihui's population is 542,873 in 2010.

History
Sihui was initially established during the Qin dynasty (221 bc—207 bc), some historians suggested Sihui first appeared during the Western Han dynasty (206 bc—8 ad), and it is one of the four most ancient counties in Guangdong province (the other three counties are Panyu county, Jieyang county and Longchuan county). 
Under the Qing, SihuiCounty made up part of the commandery of Zhaoqing. As with much of the surrounding countryside, Sihui was a source for many members of the Chinese diaspora during the late Qing.

Administrative divisions

Economy
The Zhaoqing High Technology Industrial Development Zone ( and ) is located in Sihui.

Climate

Notable people
 

Luo Xian Xiang (1890–1968), World War II general

See also
 Guangdong International Circuit
 Wangtang, a village in Jianggu, Sihui

Notes

References

Citations

Bibliography
 , reprinted 2000.

External links

 

Zhaoqing
County-level cities in Guangdong